The II. DDR-Liga (English: 2nd East German League or 2nd GDR-League) was, from 1955 to 1963, the third level of football competition in the German Democratic Republic (GDR; Deutsche Demokratische Republik or DDR; commonly East Germany).

Overview

1955–1957
The league was initially established with two divisions of 14 teams each in 1955 as the level of play below the DDR-Liga, and as such was the third tier of the East German football league system instead of the Bezirksliga which was downgraded to the fourth tier due to a reform in the league system. The divisions were Staffel Nord and Staffel Süd. In its inaugural season it was transitional thus there were no promotions or relegations, and teams played each other once within its own division. For the first six campaigns, the calendar season was adopted from the Soviet Union.

In its second season, the divisions were shifted to a home-and-away format. The champions of each division were promoted to the DDR-Liga and the last three clubs in each division were relegated to their respective Bezirksliga and promoted in their place were the six district champions, while in 1957 there were three relegations in total.

1958–1960
The league added three groups still at 14 teams each and all five were based on Bezirk (district) from north down to south and to save on travel expenses. In the promotion round the five champions competed each other once to decide the three promotions to the second tier. The number of relegations varied, and clubs were often moved between groups to balance out league numbers.

1961–1963
The league reverted to playing from autumn to spring and as a transition season, it went through three rounds and each of the fourteen clubs played 39 games. From each group, three teams were promoted due to the DDR-Liga adding another group of 14 and the last-placed team was relegated.

For the eighth and final season, the five group champions and one runners-up were promoted to the DDR-Liga, which expanded its divisions to 16 clubs, and the remaining 64 were dropped back to the Bezirksligen which became third tier leagues again. After this reform in the pyramid, the II. DDR-Liga was abolished.

Leagues below the II. DDR-Liga

For most of the existence of the II. DDR-Liga, the leagues below it were the 15 Bezirksligas, which were introduced in 1952 and formed the fourth tier of the East German pyramid for eight years. In the last DDR-Liga season, the newly recreated states of the former East Germany introduced their own regional leagues, with the exception of Mecklenburg-Western Pomerania and Berlin. They still exist today. The Bezirksligas however have mostly either disappeared, changed their name or exist in a different format. The fifteen Bezirksligas were:

Bezirksliga Schwerin
Bezirksliga Rostock
Bezirksliga Neubrandenburg
Bezirksliga Magdeburg
Bezirksliga Potsdam
Bezirksliga Berlin
Bezirksliga Halle
Bezirksliga Frankfurt/Oder
Bezirksliga Cottbus
Bezirksliga Gera
Bezirksliga Erfurt
Bezirksliga Suhl
Bezirksliga Dresden
Bezirksliga Leipzig
Bezirksliga Karl-Marx-Stadt

Champions of the II. DDR-Liga

1955–1957

1958–1963

bold denotes club gained promotion.
In 1962, the runners-up ASG Vorwärts Rostock-Gehlsdorf (Staffel 1), SG Dynamo Frankfurt (Staffel 2), BSG Motor Nordhausen West (Staffel 3), BSG Motor West Karl-Marx-Stadt (Staffel 4) and BSG Motor Steinach (Staffel 5) and third placers SC Neubrandenburg, BSG Motor Süd Brandenburg, BSG Lokomotive Halberstadt, BSG Motor Bautzen and BSG Motor Eisenach were also promoted.
In 1963, runner-up BSG Motor Dessau (Staffel 3) was also promoted.

External links
 East German league statistics at DSFS.de

Sources
 Das deutsche Fussball Archiv
 II. DDR-Liga at RSSSF.com
 
 

3
Sports leagues established in 1955
1955 establishments in East Germany
Sports leagues disestablished in 1963
1963 disestablishments in Germany
East